"Sciccherie" is a song by Italian rapper and singer Madame. It was released on 14 December 2018 by Sugar Music as Madame's debut release with a major label at the age of 16.

The song received airplay from Italian major radio networks, including Radio DeeJay. In August 2019, Cristiano Ronaldo posted an Instagram story on his account, with a video of himself listening to "Sciccherie" while on his home's terrace. Ronaldo's story attracted media attention on the song, leading several media to talk about Madame's music for the first time. In April 2020, the song was certified gold by the Federation of the Italian Music Industry, denoting 35,000 equivalent units in Italy, and reached the platinum certification (70,000 units) in September 2021. By 31 October 2021, the music video on YouTube has gathered more than 15 million views.

On Klamour, Gabriele Zangarini compared her voice in "Sciccherie" to Veronica Lucchesi of La Rappresentante di Lista, describing it as "sometimes enraged, then whispered, often theatrical".

Music video
The music video for "Sciccherie", directed by Dalilù, premiered on 21 December 2021 via Madame's YouTube channel.

Track listing

Certifications

Cover versions
A cover version of the song was performed by contestant Blue Phelix during the second live show of the fourteenth season of X Factor Italy.

References

2018 songs
2018 singles
Madame (singer) songs
Sugar Music singles